Hornsby is a tiny lunar impact crater in the western part of the Mare Serenitatis, a lunar mare in the northeast quadrant of the Moon's near side. It was named after British astronomer Thomas Hornsby. It is a solitary formation that is located at least 100 kilometers from any significant craters, although the curiously shaped depression Aratus CA lies about 50 km to the west-northwest. To the north-northwest is Linné, a feature notable for its skirt of high-albedo material. To the west of Hornsby is the wrinkle ridge Dorsum Von Cotta.

References

External links

 LTO-42D1 Hornsby — L&PI topographic map

Impact craters on the Moon